The Twins is a 2005 South Korean film and the debut feature of Park Heung-sik. Jung Joon-ho stars as identical twins with opposing personalities.

Plot 
Myung-su and Hyung-su are identical twins with opposing personalities. Hyung-su graduated top of his class in high school and is on his way to Seoul University to study law, supported by his mother, who runs a hole-in-the-wall restaurant near a train station. By contrast, Myung-su works as a bouncer at a local brothel and helps out in his mother's restaurant, but is happy to trade places with his brother whenever there is trouble. The two brothers have their lives turned upside down when Hyung-su is accused of a crime.

Cast 
 Jung Joon-ho ... Myung-su/Hyung-su
 Yoon So-yi
 Kim Hye-na
 Park Jeong-soo
 Park No-sik
 Myeong Kye-nam
 Park Sang-wook
 Oh Su-min

Production 
Jung Joon-ho took on the dual role of Myung-su and Hyung-su to further his skills as an actor, and said, "When I read the script, I really liked the story and wanted to star in the film... I begged the director to choose me". He prepared himself by studying the performances of other actors playing double roles in films, such as Jeon Do-yeon in My Mother, the Mermaid and Park Shin-yang in The Big Swindle. Prior to the launch of the film, Jung noted that he focused more on the character of Myung-su, feeling that the personality of Hyung-su was expressed less fully than he intended.

Release 
The Twins opened in South Korea on 15 April 2005, and was ranked second at the Seoul box office on its opening weekend with 42,535 admissions. The film went on to accumulate a total of 602,078 admissions nationwide.

Joon Soh of The Korea Times regarded the film's storyline as a variation of The Prince and the Pauper, and found the film to have "a surprising amount of tension due to its numerous plot twists and unexpected character development". However, Joon also commented that the film tried to fit too much story into its runtime, "[leaving] behind too many loose ends while rushing to its halfhearted ending".

References

External links 
 
 
 

2005 films
2000s Korean-language films
South Korean crime comedy films
Films directed by Park Heung-sik (born 1962)
Twins in fiction
2000s South Korean films